Several fish species are known as northern bluefin tuna including:

 Atlantic bluefin tuna (Thunnus thynnus)
 Pacific bluefin tuna (Thunnus orientalis)
 Thunnus tonggol, or longtail tuna, known as the northern bluefin tuna in Australia

See also
 Southern bluefin tuna